The sum (in Latin script, сўм in Cyrillic script, سوم in Arabic script; ISO code: UZS) is the official currency of Uzbekistan.

Etymology

The official name of the Soviet currency in Kazakh, Kyrgyz, Tajik, and Uzbek was som, and this name appeared written on the back of banknotes, among the texts for the value of the note in all 15 official languages of the USSR. The word sum (alternatively transliterated "som" or "soum") means "pure" in Kazakh, Kyrgyz, Uyghur and Uzbek, as well as in many other Turkic languages. The word implies "pure" silver or gold.

First sum

History
Like other republics of the former Soviet Union, Uzbekistan continued using the Soviet/Russian ruble after independence. On 26 July 1993, a new series of Russian ruble was issued and the old Soviet/Russian ruble ceased to be legal tender in Russia. Some successor states had their national currencies before the change, some chose to continue using the pre-1993 Soviet/Russian ruble, and some chose to use both the pre-1993 and the new Russian ruble. Tables of modern monetary history: Asia implies that both old and new rubles were used in Uzbekistan.

Uzbekistan replaced the ruble with the sum at par in on November 15, 1993. No subdivisions of this sum were issued and only banknotes were produced, in denominations of 1, 3, 5, 10, 25, 50, 100, 200, 500, 1,000, 5,000, and 10,000 sum. Because it was meant to be a transitional currency, the design was rather simplistic. All notes had the Coat of arms on obverse, and Sher-Dor Madrasah of the Registan in Samarkand on reverse.

Coins
No coins were issued for the first sum.

Banknotes
The first banknotes were issued by the State Bank of Uzbekistan in 1993. All of the denominations share the same designs: the Coat of arms of Uzbekistan on the front and the madrasahs on Registan Square in Samarkand.

Second sum

History

On 1 July 1994, a second sum was introduced at a rate of 1 new sum = 1,000 old sum. This sum is subdivided into 100 tiyin.

Inflation 
Until 2013, the largest denomination of Uzbek currency was the 1,000 sum banknote, then worth US$0.60, requiring Uzbeks to carry large bundles of notes for routine transactions.

Since 2019, the largest denomination is the 100,000 sum banknote (as of October 2019 worth US$10.55), which made the situation easier. However, coins and banknotes smaller than 50 sum are rare now.

The rampant inflation situation is considered a politically sensitive issue in Uzbekistan, which is why the Uzbek government is slow to acclimate the currency to its current value by issuing higher coin and note denominations. As a result, the current highest coin denomination in circulation is the 500 sum while the highest banknote denomination is the 100,000 sum. Official state figures put inflation as of the first half of 2011 at 3.6%, however accurate numbers are pinned far higher. Coins and banknotes below 50 sum are practically worthless now.

Coins 
Three series of coins have been issued for the second sum. They can be easily distinguished by the script used for the Uzbek language. The first series was written in Cyrillic script, while the second and third series is written in Latin script.

First series (1994-2000)

Second series (2000-2004)

Third series (2018)
In May 2018 the introduction of new coins valued 50, 100, 200 and 500 sum was announced. All previously issued banknotes and coins of those denominations are to be withdrawn from circulation by 1 July 2020. In 2022, the Central Bank of the Republic of Uzbekistan introduced a 1,000 sum coin into circulation, notable as it is the first bi-metallic coin issued for circulation since the introduction of the Uzbek sum in 1994.

Banknotes 
The second and current series, issued by the Central Bank of the Republic of Uzbekistan, was released in 1994 in denominations of 1, 3, 5, 10, 25, 50, and 100 sum. A 200 sum banknote was issued in 1997, the 500 sum in 1999, the 1,000 sum in 2001, the 5,000 sum in 2013, the 10,000 sum on 10 March 2017, the 50,000 sum on 22 August 2017 and the 100,000 sum on 25 February 2019. The latter four denominations feature inscriptions in Latin-based Uzbek as opposed to Uzbek Cyrillic in banknotes of 1 to 1,000 Uzbek sum. On 14 June 2021, the Central Bank of the Republic of Uzbekistan issued the 2,000 and 20,000 sum banknotes to help bridge the gap between 1,000 and 5,000 sum as well as 10,000 and 50,000 sum. On 18 June 2021, the Central Bank of the Republic of Uzbekistan issued new 5,000 and 10,000 sum banknotes, utilizing the design templates of the 2,000 and 20,000 sum banknotes. In that same year, the Central Bank of the Republic of Uzbekistan issued new 50,000 and 100,000 sum banknotes as part of a new series of banknotes first introduced with the 2,000 and 20,000 sum banknotes. An entirely new 200,000 sum banknote was issued on 15 July 2022.

Exchange rates
At its introduction on 1 July 1994, 1 US dollar was equal to 25 sum.

2017 reform 
On 2 September 2017, President of Uzbekistan Shavkat Mirziyoyev issued a decree "On priority measures of liberalizing foreign exchange policy". The reform took effect on 5 September 2017. The currency was untethered from its US dollar peg and started to float. As a result the sum's exchange rate to the US dollar increased from 4,210 Uzbek sum to 8,100 Uzbek sum. The new rate was even weaker than the sum's black-market convertibility of about 7,700 to the dollar. Restrictions on the amount of foreign currencies individuals and companies could buy were also abolished on the same day.

See also
Economy of Uzbekistan
Kyrgyzstani som
For earlier currencies used in Uzbekistan, see Bukharan tenga, Kokand tenga and Khwarazmi tenga

Notes

References

External links
 

Economy of Uzbekistan
Currencies introduced in 1993
Currencies introduced in 1994